Kyōji (written: , ,  or , and alternatively romanised as Kyoji, Kyouji or Kyozi) is a masculine Japanese given name. Notable people with the name include:

, Japanese mixed martial artist
, Japanese physicist
, Japanese diplomat
, Japanese mathematician 
, Japanese boxer
, Japanese historian
, Japanese musician, singer-songwriter and record producer
, Japanese gymnast

Fictional characters
Kyoji Kash, a character in the anime series Mobile Fighter G Gundam
 a character in the light novel series Sword Art Online

Japanese masculine given names